The 23rd Yukon Territorial Council, the final term of the Yukon Territorial Council before it was replaced with the contemporary Legislative Assembly of Yukon, was in session from 1974 to 1978. Membership was set by the 1974 Yukon general election, with one follow-up by-election in 1975 after the election of Willard Phelps was overturned on conflict of interest grounds.  

The election was noted for the expansion of the territorial council from seven to twelve members, the largest in its history. Nine of the twelve electoral districts were new ones which had not existed in the preceding election; although due to another redistribution when the Legislative Assembly was created, four of the new districts were represented only in the 23rd council and were not recontested in the 1978 election.

Members

References

Yukon Legislative Assemblies
Yukon politics-related lists